Mahaprithibi (World Within, World Without) is a Bengali social drama film directed by Mrinal Sen. This film was released in 1991 under the banner of G. G. Films and received BFJA Awards in 1992.

Plot
The film revolves with the global changing social order. An elderly lady of a family committed suicide, then some reasons as to why she has committed suicide are revealed. She has three sons and a daughter: her eldest son was involved in the Naxalbari uprising and was killed brutally by the police. Her widowed daughter-in-law had an affair with her other son before their marriage. Soon after the death of his elder brother, the younger goes to Germany, becomes jobless and returns to Kolkata. The youngest son is unemployed and the only daughter is a mental patient. All these affects the lady and she commits suicide.

Cast
 Soumitra Chatterjee
 Aparna Sen
 Victor Bannerjee
 Anjan Dutt
 Asit Bandopadhyay
 Anashua Majumdar
 Gita Dey
 Chandan Roy
 Abhijit Mukhopadhyay
 Kumarjit Chattopadhyay
 Mukul Chowdhury

References

1991 films
1991 drama films
Bengali-language Indian films
Indian drama films
Films directed by Mrinal Sen
Films set in Kolkata
1990s Bengali-language films
Films scored by B. V. Karanth